The construction of the Chandni Chowk Flyover was started, at a busy locality of Rawalpindi, on November 3, 2011. Chandni Chowk is considered one of the most central locations of the city of Rawalpindi. On an average, 128,900 vehicles pass through this junction daily which had caused traffic congestion issues. The construction of flyover at the junction confirms a smooth flow of traffic at the Murree Road and particularly at Chandni Chowk. The flyover was completed in 127 days.

The length of the flyover is 403 metres, and it has three lanes each side. On an average, 128,900 vehicles pass through this junction daily and the flyover will help solve the traffic mess on Benazir Bhutto Road, particularly at Chandni Chowk, which had been a great concern for motorists, transporters and commuters.

It opened on 11 March 2012.
Chandni chowk is also famous due to food corner situated on its right side while entering from Islamabad

Construction details

See also 

 Kalma Chowk Flyover
 Abdullah Gul Interchange
 Harbanspura Interchange
 Saggian Interchange, Lahore
 Lahore Ring Road

References 

Bridges in Pakistan
Buildings and structures in Punjab, Pakistan